Sir Andrew Benjamin Cohen  (7 October 1909 – 17 June 1968) was Governor of Uganda from 1952 to 1957.

Early life and education 
Cohen was from a distinguished Anglo-Jewish family.  He was a descendant of Levy Barent Cohen.  He was educated at Malvern College and Trinity College, Cambridge. He was a Cambridge Apostle.

Rhodesia and Nyasaland
As Colonial Office Assistant Undersecretary for African Affairs, Cohen was involved in negotiations for a federal state for the Rhodesias and Nyasaland in 1950.  The Jewish Cohen, traumatised by the Holocaust, was an anti-racialist and an advocate of African rights. However, he compromised his ideals to combat a threat that he perceived to be even more menacing: the risk that Southern Rhodesia, if it turned hostile, would fall into the orbit of the National Party government in South Africa.

To Cohen, the risk of radical Afrikaner white supremacy posed a greater menace than the perpetuation of the less inflexible, paternalistic white ascendancy system of Southern Rhodesia. Having come to terms with this compromise, Cohen went on to become one of the central architects and driving forces behind the creation of the Federation, often seemingly single-handedly untangling deadlocks and outright walkouts on the part of the respective parties.

The negotiations and conferences were indeed arduous. Southern Rhodesia and the Northern Territories had very different traditions when it came to the 'Native Question' (Africans) and the roles they were designed to play in civil society. Thus, it took nearly three years for the CAF to be established. And, once it was established, it proved to be "one of the most elaborately governed countries in the world."

Governor of Uganda
In 1952 he was appointed Governor of Uganda, with the task of preparing that country for independence. He reorganised the Legislative Council (LEGCO) to include African representatives elected from districts throughout Uganda, thus creating the basis for a representative parliament.  He also introduced economic initiatives, including the establishment of the Uganda Development Corporation.

In 1953 the Lukiiko (Parliament) of Buganda sought independence from Uganda. Edward Mutesa II, the Kabaka (king) of Buganda demanded that Buganda be separated from the rest of the protectorate and transferred to Foreign Office jurisdiction. On 30 November Cohen deposed the Kabaka and ordered his exile to London. His forced departure made the Kabaka an instant martyr in the eyes of the Baganda, whose latent separatism and anticolonial sentiments set off a storm of protest. Cohen's action had backfired, and he could find no one among the Baganda prepared or able to mobilise support for his schemes. After two frustrating years of unrelenting Ganda hostility and obstruction, Cohen was forced to reinstate "Kabaka Freddie". The Kabaka returned to Kampala on 17 October 1955. Abu Mayanja was among those who escorted Sir Edward Mutesa from his London exile in 1955.

The negotiations leading to the Kabaka's return, although appearing to satisfy the British, were a resounding victory for the Baganda. Cohen secured the Kabaka's agreement not to oppose independence within the larger Uganda framework. Not only was the Kabaka reinstated in return, but for the first time since 1889, the monarch was given the power to appoint and dismiss his chiefs (Buganda government officials) instead of acting as a mere figurehead while they conducted the affairs of government. The Kabaka's new power was cloaked in the misleading claim that he would be only a "constitutional monarch," while in fact he was a leading player in deciding how Uganda would be governed, and would become the country's first president in 1962.

UN Trusteeship Council
From 1957 Cohen was the UK representative to the United Nations Trusteeship Council.  In 1959 he was a member of the Special Mission to Samoa to negotiate its independence from New Zealand.  He was involved in the transfer of the Trust Territory of Southern Cameroons to the French-controlled state of the Cameroun Republic on 1 October 1961. Cohen had argued against offering independence to the territory, and pro-independence Southern Cameroonians blamed him for the fact that the UN did not allow that question to be put.

Later life
Cohen was Permanent Secretary of the Minister of Overseas Development from 1964 until his death from a heart attack in 1968.

References 

 Dictionary of National Biography
 Who's Who (UK)
 Obituary, Jewish Chronicle, 21 June 1968, page 46.

1909 births
1968 deaths
Alumni of Trinity College, Cambridge
British Jews
Governors of Uganda
History of Uganda
Jewish politicians
Knights Commander of the Order of St Michael and St George
Knights Commander of the Royal Victorian Order
People educated at Malvern College
Officers of the Order of the British Empire